Grein may refer to:

 Grein, Austria, a municipality in the district Perg in Upper Austria
 J. T. Grein (1862–1935), a Dutch-born theatre impresario and drama critic